"Boing!" was a single of the new album "3 : Fresh - Fri - Fly" of the Danish Hip-Hop band, Nik & Jay.  It reached  #1 in the Danish Club and the Danish charts.

References

2006 singles
2006 songs